Mihai Țurcan (born 4 October 1941) is a Romanian former football forward. He scored Dinamo Pitești's only goal in the 2–1 loss against Ştiinţa Cluj in the 1965 Cupa României final.

Honours
Dinamo Pitești
Divizia B: 1962–63
Cupa României runner-up: 1964–65
Chimia Râmnicu Vâlcea
Divizia C: 1970–71

Notes

References

External links
Mihai Țurcan at Labtof.ro

1941 births
Living people
Romanian footballers
Association football forwards
Liga I players
Liga II players
Liga III players
CS Minerul Lupeni players
FC Argeș Pitești players
CSM Jiul Petroșani players
Chimia Râmnicu Vâlcea players
People from Vâlcea County